Great Plains Aircraft Supply Company is an American aircraft manufacturer of experimental plans based primarily on the Volkswagen air-cooled engine. Great Plains provides VW engine conversions for use in experimental aircraft.

Great Plains has been selling and manufacturing conversions of VW engines since circa 1982. Among their offerings is the Great Plains Type 1 Front Drive engine series.

Great Plains also helds the rights to the Sonerai series of aircraft designed by John Monnett until 2015, when they were acquired by Sonerai Works LLC, of Franksville, Wisconsin. Previous owners of the design were INAV Experimental in 1987.

Aircraft

References

External links
http://www.sonerai.com
http://www.easyeagle1.com

Homebuilt aircraft
Aircraft engine manufacturers of the United States